Madeleine Lambert (1892–1977) was a French stage, television and film actress.

Filmography

References

Bibliography
 Goble, Alan. The Complete Index to Literary Sources in Film. Walter de Gruyter, 1999.

External links

1892 births
1977 deaths
French film actresses
French stage actresses
20th-century French women